Dragan Džajić (born 30 May 1946) is a Serbian football administrator and former player who is the current president of the Football Association of Serbia from 14 March 2023.

Džajić is widely considered to be one of the best footballers to emerge from the former Yugoslavia, and one of the greatest left wingers of all time. Džajić was known for his crosses, passes, dribbling with great pace, natural technique and his left footed free kicks.

In November 2003, to celebrate UEFA's Jubilee, he was selected as the Golden Player of Serbia and Montenegro by the Football Association of Serbia and Montenegro as their most outstanding player of the past 50 years.

Club career
Born on 30 May 1946, in the small town of Ub, 60 kilometres outside Belgrade, Džajić's football career (1961–1978) was spent primarily with Red Star Belgrade. A left winger, his career with the club spanned 590 games and 287 goals by winning five league titles and four Yugoslavian Cups. In 1969, Džajić received the Sport newspaper's Golden Badge award for Yugoslavia's best athlete. He is considered to have been one of the most important players in the history of the club and is one of only five players to have been awarded the Zvezdine zvezde status.

Red Star Belgrade

Early starter
Džajić was plucked from the relative obscurity of his local club, FK Jedinstvo, by Red Star Belgrade youth coach Miljan Miljanić, spending two years in the club's youth system.

Though only 17 years and 8 days of age, Džajić was handed his first team debut by head coach Miša Pavić in a Yugoslav First League match against FK Budućnost Titograd on 8 June 1963, which finished 0–0. It was the last week of the 1962–63 league season with FK Partizan already clinching the league championship and Red Star hovering in 7th place, out of European spots. The match was played at Omladinski Stadium at Karaburma because Red Star's famous home Marakana was in the final construction stages.

Džajić started out as a left-back but it was further up the flank that he made his impact. An expert dribbler, his left foot provided countless goals for teammate Vojin Lazarević. Džajić was rewarded with championship medals in 1964, 1968, 1969, 1970 and 1973, while he lifted the cup in 1964, 1968, 1970 and 1971.

Semi-final defeat
European Champion Clubs' Cup success very nearly came his way too. In the 1970–71 season, Red Star Belgrade reached the semi-finals of the top continental club competition, and beat Panathinaikos FC 4–1 in the first leg in Belgrade. Džajić was suspended for the return in Athens, however, which the Greek team won 3–0 to go through on away goals.

Bastia
From 1975 to 1977, he played for SC Bastia in France (scoring another 31 times). He is considered to have been one of their most notable players of all time.

International career
Džajić was just eighteen when he was first named to the Yugoslav national team. He made his debut on 17 June 1964 in a 2–1 defeat against Romania at the JNA Stadium in Belgrade. Džajić would go on to earn 85 caps (the most in the history of the Yugoslav national team) and score 23 goals. He became renowned for his passing, dribbling and goal-scoring. His most famous international match was likely the 1968 European Championship semifinal against England, in which his 87th-minute lob over the goalkeeper Gordon Banks gave Yugoslavia a 1–0 victory against the defending world champions. The British press dubbed him "the magic Dragan." He went on to score in the final against Italy but he could not prevent Yugoslavia losing 2–0 after a replay.

Džajić said about his most well-known international matches (at the UEFA Euro 1968):

He participated in the 1974 FIFA World Cup which was held in West Germany. Džajić participated in Yugoslavia's opening championship game draw with world champions Brazil and scored one goal in a record victory of 9–0 against Zaire. However, after passing the second stage of the championship, Yugoslavia didn't repeat the results of their opening games. They lost three games in a row, and had to return home.

Administrative
Džajić retired as a player in 1978, at the age of 32. Right away, he began performing a role as Red Star's technical director. In his first season in the new administrative role, the club reached the UEFA Cup final. Džajić became the main decision-maker within the club when it comes to transfer policy.

In 1998, Džajić became the club's president – a position he resigned from in 2004 due to health issues.

Corruption allegations and presidential abolition 
On 31 January 2011, the trial started in which Džajić was charged of fraud perpetrated during the sale of players from Red Star Belgrade during Džajić's time as the president of the club, specifically Nemanja Vidić. Džajić pleaded not guilty. The charges against Nemanja Vidić were dropped. Nemanja Vidić also denied all accusations against Dragan Džajić.

On 16 November 2012, Tomislav Nikolić, the President of Serbia, signed an exempt from criminal liability of all charges. This abolition ended all legal proceedings against Džajić.

Return to Red Star and re-election as president in 2012
It was stated by local Serbian newspapers at the beginning of December 2011 that Džajić would return to the administration of Red Star, as it was believed that Džajić was the only one who could get Red Star back on track. However, nothing came of this. Džajić spoke to Blic (tabloid daily newspaper in Serbia) after the board meeting, saying: "I spoke with people from the club, the desire to return was not disputed, I wanted to help, because everything that I previously experienced with the club cannot be forgotten. I followed, listened to and read what happened at the meeting, I wanted to come back but nothing happened and life goes on. I remain available and in this case I can only wish Red Star better days."

On 19 December 2012, Džajić was elected as President of Red Star Belgrade for the second time. He resigned from the position on 19 June 2014. He was then chosen as honorary president of the club.

Legacy

In November 2011, Džajić was named to "the greatest European Championship XI of all time" by Goal.com.

On 2 December 2022, Red Star Belgrade announced that the number 11 worn by Džajić will be retired from the 2023–24 season on.

Honours

Club
Red Star Belgrade 
 Yugoslav First League: 1963–64, 1967–68, 1968–69, 1969–70, 1972–73
 Yugoslav Cup: 1963–64, 1967–68, 1969–70, 1970–71
 Mitropa Cup: 1968

International
Yugoslavia 
 Mediterranean Games: 1971
 UEFA European Championship runner-up: 1968

Individual
Awards
 UEFA Euro Top Scorer: 1968
 UEFA Euro Team of the Tournament: 1968, 1976
 Ballon d'Or (3rd place): 1968
 Golden Badge: 1969
 World Soccer World XI: 1969
 Best Sportsman of SD Crvena Zvezda: 1966, 1967, 1968, 1969, 1970
 YU-Serbian UEFA Golden Player: 2004
 FIFA XI: 1968

References

External links

 Profile at Serbian national football team website 
 UEFA.com – Serbia and Montenegro's Golden Player

Living people
1946 births
People from Ub, Serbia
Association football wingers
Association football midfielders
Serbian footballers
Yugoslav footballers
Yugoslavia international footballers
UEFA Golden Players
Red Star Belgrade footballers
Red Star Belgrade non-playing staff
Yugoslav First League players
SC Bastia players
Ligue 1 players
Serbian expatriate footballers
Yugoslav expatriate footballers
Expatriate footballers in France
Olympic footballers of Yugoslavia
Footballers at the 1964 Summer Olympics
UEFA Euro 1968 players
1974 FIFA World Cup players
UEFA Euro 1976 players
Serbian sports executives and administrators
Mediterranean Games gold medalists for Yugoslavia
Competitors at the 1971 Mediterranean Games
Mediterranean Games medalists in football
Presidents of the Football Association of Serbia